The 1999–2000 Northern Counties East Football League season was the 18th in the history of Northern Counties East Football League, a football competition in England.

Premier Division

The Premier Division featured 17 clubs which competed in the previous season, along with three new clubs.
Clubs promoted from Division One:
Brodsworth Miners Welfare
Harrogate Railway Athletic

Plus:
Alfreton Town, relegated from the Northern Premier League

League table

Division One

Division One featured 11 clubs which competed in the previous season, along with five new clubs.
Clubs relegated from the Premier Division:
Pickering Town
Pontefract Collieries

Clubs joined from the Central Midlands League:
Goole
Mickleover Sports

Plus:
Bridlington Town, joined from the East Riding County League

League table

References

External links
 Northern Counties East Football League

1999-2000
8